Wilson's Airport  is a privately owned, public use airport located four nautical miles (5 mi, 7 km) south of the central business district of Hickory, a city in Catawba County, North Carolina, United States.

Facilities and aircraft 
Wilson's Airport covers an area of 27 acres (11 ha) at an elevation of 985 feet (300 m) above mean sea level. It has one runway designated 17/35 with a turf surface measuring 2,175 by 70 feet (663 × 21 m).

For the 12-month period ending August 11, 2011, the airport had 800 aircraft operations, an average of 66 per month: 94% general aviation and 6% military. At that time there were 10 aircraft based at this airport: 90% single-engine and 10% ultralight.

References

External links 
  at North Carolina DOT airport guide
 Aerial image as of March 1998 from USGS The National Map
 

Airports in North Carolina
Transportation in Catawba County, North Carolina
Buildings and structures in Catawba County, North Carolina